Acute basophilic leukemia is a rare form of acute myeloid leukemia where blasts are accompanied by abnormal basophils in all stages of differentiation. It would most likely be classified as M0 without electron microscopic confirmation of basophil lineage.

Presentation
Differentiated (basophilic granules by light microscopy) and poorly differentiated cases; Majority are poorly differentiated. MPO negative by light microscopy; granules positive in a speckled pattern by electron microscopy. Myeloid antigens are expressed. Diagnosis of poorly differentiated cases made by electron microscopy. May manifest basophil and mast cell granules by EM. Cytogenetically heterogeneous but frequently associated with Philadelphia chromosome. There is no clinically distinguishing features but may be more common in children and young adults and carry a poor prognosis.

Diagnosis

References

External links 

Acute myeloid leukemia